The 2018 LKL Playoffs featured the eight best teams of the Lietuvos krepšinio lyga (LKL) basketball league in Lithuania, competing for the championship spot. This was the LKL playoffs' 24th edition. Žalgiris achieved their 20th title overall, eight consecutive.
 
The quarter-finals were played in a best-of-five format, with the higher seeded team playing the first and (if necessary) third game at home. The semi-finals were played in a best-of-five format and the finals in a best-of-seven format, with the higher seed team playing games 1, 3, 5 and 7 (if necessary) at home.

Bracket

Quarterfinals

|}

Neptūnas vs Pieno žvaigždės

Lietuvos rytas vs Juventus

Semifinals

|}

Finals

|}

See also
2017–18 LKL season

References

External links
 LKL website

2017–18 LKL season